Charles Wiggins Cobb (1875–1949) was an American mathematician and economist and a 1912 Ph.D. graduate of the University of Michigan.  He published many works on both subjects, however he is most famous for developing the Cobb–Douglas production function in economics. He worked on this project with the economist Paul H. Douglas while lecturing at Amherst College in Massachusetts. In 1928, Charles Cobb and Paul Douglas published a study in which they modeled the growth of the American economy during the period 1899–1922.  They considered a simplified view of the economy in which production of output is determined by the amount of labor involved and the amount of capital used.  While there are many other factors affecting economic performance, their model proved to be remarkably accurate.  He also authored a number of books and pamphlets in his time including, 'The asymptotic development for a certain integral function of zero order,' in 1913, while working to attain his doctorate in Mathematics.

References

External links 

Charles Wiggins Cobb (AC 1897) Papers at the Amherst College Archives & Special Collections

1875 births
1949 deaths
19th-century American mathematicians
20th-century American mathematicians
American economists
Amherst College alumni
University of Michigan alumni